Applecross was an electoral district of the Legislative Assembly in the Australian state of Western Australia from 1989 to 1996.

The district was based in the inner southern suburbs of Perth. First contested at the 1989 state election, it was held for two terms by Liberal MP Richard Lewis, who had previously been member for East Melville. The district was abolished ahead of the 1996 state election.

Members for Applecross

Election results

Applecross
Constituencies established in 1989
1989 establishments in Australia
Constituencies disestablished in 1996
1996 disestablishments in Australia